Nebria diversa is a species of beetle from family Carabidae found in Canada and such US states as California, Oregon, and Washington.

References

diversa
Beetles described in 1863
Beetles of North America
Endemic fauna of the United States